Brett Brochu (born September 9, 2002) is a Canadian major junior ice hockey player who plays for the London Knights.

Early life
Brett Brochu was born in Windsor, Ontario on September 9, 2002, and spent his youth playing hockey.

Professional career
Brochu's Ontario Hockey League career record is 48-11-1, where he plays for the London Knights. In 2020 he was awarded the  F. W. "Dinty" Moore Trophy. During the 2020–21 season, when the OHL season was postponed due to COVID-19, Brochu played for the Wilkes-Barre Scranton Penguins of the American Hockey League. He missed several games to netmind for Team Canada for the 2022 World Junior Hockey Championships, which were cancelled part way through.

International play

Brochu was recruited as a goaltender for roster of Team Canada during the World Junior Hockey Championships in 2021. After winning the starting job for the national team over two other netminders, he made twenty saves against twenty-two shots in his debut game, as Canada won 11–2 over Team Austria. The tournament was later rescheduled due to the spread of the Omicron variant, but Brochu rejoined the roster when it was resumed in August of 2022, winning gold alongside Team Canada.

References

External links
 

2002 births
Living people
Canadian ice hockey goaltenders
Ice hockey people from Ontario
London Knights players
Sportspeople from Windsor, Ontario